The Women's scratch event of the 2016 UCI Track Cycling World Championships was held on 3 March 2016. Laura Trott of Great Britain won gold.

Results
The race was started at 20:20.

References

Women's scratch
UCI Track Cycling World Championships – Women's scratch
UCI